Papyrus Oxyrhynchus 658 (P. Oxy. 658 or P. Oxy. IV 658) is one of four examples of libelli found at Oxyrhynchus in Egypt. The last lines of the manuscript declare the date — the first year of the emperor Decius, whose full name was Gaius Messius Quintus Traianus Decius. We know the first year of his reign was 250 AD.

Text
Original lines are retained (and numbered).
Text in [brackets] is reconstructed to fill a gap (lacuna) in the papyrus.
Full stops in brackets represent character spaces that cannot be reconstructed.
Text in (parentheses) is full spelling of an abbreviation.
Letters with subscript dots are incomplete or indistinct.

See also
Lapsi (Christian)
Oxyrhynchus papyri
Other libelli: POxy 1464, POxy 2990, POxy 3929
Warrant to arrest a Christian: POxy 3035
Papyrus Oxyrhynchus 657

References

External links

POxy 0658
658
POxy 0658